Craig Conway may refer to:

Craig Conway (actor) (born 1975), English actor
Craig Conway (footballer) (born 1985), Scottish footballer
Craig Conway, American driver 2002 24 Hours of Daytona